John Rhodes (born on 18 August 1927) is a British former racing driver from England, who participated in one Formula One World Championship Grand Prix, the 1965 British Grand Prix, at Silverstone on 10 July 1965, from which he retired on lap 39 with ignition problems.  His Cooper-Climax T60 was provided for him by veteran racer Bob Gerard.

In 1961 he drove a Cooper-B.M.C. Formula Junior car for the Midland Racing Partnership, winning a long race on the Phoenix Park circuit in Dublin on 22 July, and the Dunboyne Trophy on 29 July. On 11 June 1962, he drove Bob Gerard's Cooper-Ford in the 2,000 Guineas F1 race at Mallory Park. Rhodes soldiered on with the Cooper-B.M.C. FJ car in 1963 when the Ford engine was required to win. That year he competed in a works Mini-Cooper 'S' type in saloon car racing, finishing 8th with Rob Slotemaker in The Motor International Six-Hour Saloon-Car Race at Brands Hatch on 6 July. In 1965 Rhodes continued with the Mini, taking fourth place, among the big bangers, in the Ilford Films Trophy at Brands Hatch on 13 March. He failed to finish in the BRDC International Trophy at Silverstone in Bob Gerard's Cooper-Ford on 15 May 1965.

At Le Mans in 1965 John Rhodes, with Paul Hawkins, finished twelfth overall, and first in class, in a 1.3-litre Austin-Healey Sebring Sprite entered by the Donald Healey Motor Company, completing 278 laps. In 1966 at the Targa Florio, Rhodes partnered with Timo Mäkinen, finished ninth overall and won the class in an M.G.B.

Racing record

Complete Formula One World Championship results
(key)

Complete Formula One Non-Championship results
(key)

Complete British Saloon Car Championship results
(key) (Races in bold indicate pole position; races in italics indicate fastest lap.)

† Events with 2 races staged for the different classes.

^ Race with 2 heats - Aggregate result.

References

1927 births
Possibly living people
Sportspeople from Wolverhampton
English racing drivers
English Formula One drivers
Bob Gerard Racing Formula One drivers
24 Hours of Le Mans drivers
British Touring Car Championship drivers
World Sportscar Championship drivers
European Touring Car Championship drivers